The JŽ class 441 is an electric locomotive built for Yugoslav Railways. The units are now used by Hrvatske željeznice (HŽ class 1141), Željeznice Federacije Bosne i Hercegovine, Željeznice Republike Srpske, Serbian Railways and Rail transport of TPP Nikola Tesla (ŽS 441), Makedonski Železnici, Turkish State Railways and Romanian Railways-CFR.

History
This series is originally based on the license of the Swedish company ASEA and the SJ Rb locomotive from Sweden. It was produced in order to be used as a universal locomotive, for both passenger and freight traffic on mainline electrified routes. There was also a need to have a powerful electric locomotive to pull freight. Originally, it had diode voltage selector. A later, modernised series, the 3xx subseries, include thyristor voltage selector, and an on-board computer. Later 3xx series have an onboard look-behind-camera for video surveillance of the sides and also new livery.

Voltage 
This locomotive utilises 25 kV/50 Hz AC.

Gearing 
The models with higher maximum speed have lower tractive power and are used for passenger or light freight trains only, whereas the models with lower maximum speed have high tractive power and are thus able to pull heavy freight trains.

Liveries 
Original livery of Yugoslav Railways was red (occasionally orange) and blue with white stripe and "Jugoslovenske železnice" inscription on it. Serbian Railways class 441 units were later recolored into a red and grey livery. Post-overhaul units owned by Srbija Voz are colored in the new "swoosh" livery shared with Stadler FLIRT EMUs, while unoverhauled and Srbija Kargo units retain the red and grey color scheme. 

Locomotives of Republika Srpska have similar livery as the original Yugoslav, but with faded colours and a white stripe between blue and red.

In Croatia, there are three basic liveries. The standard one is the red with white stripe. There is also a very rare livery, in colours similar to Croatian flag. The third, newest livery is the HŽ official livery (red and grey with blue stripe).

The Romanian Railways' original livery was in grey with a red or blue stripe, some examples even with the Romanian tricolor flag used instead of the blue or red stripe (similar case to a few members of EA class), but after 2000, the traditional white-red (front ends) livery has been applied. A reversed variation of it appeared on the 3 Class 46 locomotives modernized in Croatia, whilst for the rest Class 46 members, the livery is similar to the ones applied on the Class 47 locomotives.

Export 

Starting with 1972, between Yugoslavia and Romania a convention was concluded for reciprocal delivery for locomotives. It also involved the Romanian companies Electroputere Craiova and UCM Reşiţa. Thus the Romanian party delivered to Yugoslavia a number of 103 Co’Co locomotives of the 461 JŽ series and sub-assemblies for 130 Bo’Bo locomotives of the 441 JŽ series, delivered to Romania and registered with CFR under the number 040-EC (Class 43) between 1973 and 1984. The Yugoslavian locomotives derived directly from the already renowned prototype ASEA RB1 improved in the mechanical construction under the RC1 series pattern. A number of locomotives have been modernised to Class 46, initially 3 units by Končar Group, and later by PROMAT and Softronic Craiova. Class 46 is also a number used by Class 43/44 locomotives that were reclassified after being renumbered into UIC system, though with no modernisation what so ever. The Class 44 (040-EC1) is the same as Class 43, but modified for higher speeds (160 km/h).

Since the dissolution of SFRY, this locomotive is also exported. Some pieces are in North Macedonia, and some were leased to Turkish Railways (as TCDD E52500 class). Now, most of the former Republics which have been formed after the dissolving of Yugoslavia have some of these locomotives, inherited from the former JŽ. These units have different designations, but very similar characteristics.

In popular culture
One example made an appearance coming out of a tunnel towards the end of the movie Force 10 From Navarone. This is anachronistic as the movie took place during World War II.

Gallery

References

External links 

 Characteristics and some description

441
Bo′Bo′ locomotives
25 kV AC locomotives
441
1141
441
441
Standard gauge locomotives of Croatia
Standard gauge locomotives of Bosnia and Herzegovina
Standard gauge locomotives of Serbia
Standard gauge locomotives of North Macedonia
Standard gauge locomotives of Turkey
Standard gauge locomotives of Romania